Hugo: CannonCruise is an action game in the Hugo series. It developed and published by ITE Media on November 3, 2004, for the PC and the PlayStation 2. The game was released in the continental Europe-only. A mobile version was released by Kiloo also in 2004; it is currently available for free.

Gameplay

Plot
A legend tells of the enchanted Phoenix Tree in which only once for a thousand years a single apple grows. If one eats the apple after it has become ripe, his or her three wishes will be fulfilled. The evil witch Scylla strives for absolute power and eternal beauty — and because she was foiled many times by Triggy Forest trolls, she would love to see them wiped out. Now she sees her chance for all of her wishes to come true, and the all she needs to do is to find the sealed cave of the ancient witch queen Princess Iduna. Hugo the troll and his friend Fernando must defeat the witch's army of pirates and get into the cave before Scylla does, or else he and all the trolls will be gone forever.

Reception

In its native Denmark, the PlayStation 2 version was awarded a score of 7/10 from GameReactor, and three out of six stars from Geek Culture.

References

2004 video games
Action video games
Europe-exclusive video games
Free-to-play video games
Hugo video games
Mobile games
PlayStation 2 games
Video games developed in Denmark
Windows games